|}

The Newlands Chase is a Grade 3 National Hunt steeplechase in Ireland which is open to horses aged five years or older. 
It is run at Naas over a distance of about 2 miles (3,218 metres) and during the race there are 10 fences to be jumped. The race is scheduled to take place each year in late February or early March.

The race was run as a handicap until 1994, was not run in 1995, and returned in 1996 as a Listed race.  The race was raised to Grade 2 status in 2003 and was downgraded to Grade 3 in 2017. It is currently sponsored by Paddy Power bookmakers and run under a sponsored title.

Records
Most successful horse since 1988 (3 wins):
 Opera Hat – 1996, 1997, 1998
 Days Hotel - 2013, 2014, 2016 

Leading jockey since 1988 (4 wins):
 Anthony Powell – Flying Ferret (1988), Guesswork (1993), Opera Hat (1996, 1997) 
 Ruby Walsh -  Papillon (1999), Moscow Express (2001), Nickname (2007), Seabass (2012)
 Paul Carberry -  Arctic Copper (2003), 	Strong Run (2004), Central House (2005), Sir Oj (2006)

Leading trainer since 1988 (5 wins):
 Henry de Bromhead -  Days Hotel (2013, 2014, 2016), Alisier D'Irlande (2017), Captain Guinness (2022)

Winners since 1988

See also
 Horse racing in Ireland
 List of Irish National Hunt races

References

Racing Post:

National Hunt chases
National Hunt races in Ireland
Naas Racecourse